Radha Gyawali (Nepali: राधा ज्ञवाली) a member of the Communist Party of Nepal (Unified Marxist-Leninist), assumed the post of the Minister of Energy on 25 February 2014 under Sushil Koirala-led government. She also became the Energy minister under Baburam Bhattarai-led government.

References

1954 births
Date of birth missing (living people)
Communist Party of Nepal (Unified Marxist–Leninist) politicians
Government ministers of Nepal
Living people
Nepal MPs 2017–2022
Nepal Communist Party (NCP) politicians
21st-century Nepalese women politicians
21st-century Nepalese politicians
Members of the 1st Nepalese Constituent Assembly